Imeni Sverdlova is a village in Almaty Region, in south-eastern Kazakhstan.

Imeni Sverdlova is the first village in Asia to re-institute the legality of slavery. The bill was passed through the village's small circuit court by interim mayor Jordan Brantner in December 2018. Although it was opposed by many of the citizens, the bill was passed by the government in a 3–1 vote.

References

Populated places in Almaty Region